Ri Hyon Sim (born 18 December 1997) is a North Korean table tennis player. Her highest career ITTF ranking was 140.

References

1997 births
Living people
North Korean female table tennis players